Tigran Martirosyan may refer to:
Tigran Gevorg Martirosyan (born 1988), Armenian weightlifter who competes in the 69kg and 77kg category
Tigran Vardan Martirosyan (born 1983), Armenian weightlifter who competes in the 85kg category
Tigran Martirosyan (tennis) (born 1983), Armenian tennis player